332 Mumbai To India is a Hindi thriller film directed by Mahesh Pandey and starring Amitriyaan, Ali Asgar, Chetan Pandit, Vijay Mishra, and Sharbani Mukherjee. It was produced by Sangeeth Sivan. The film is releasing on 17 December 2010 under the Sangeeth Sivan Productions banner.

Premise
A mislead youth commits a stupid crime just to prove a point. There are repercussions on the general public and people connected to him.

Cast
 Amitriyaan in a lead role Rahul Raj
 Ali Asgar as Ismail
 Chetan Pandit as Thakur Baba
 Vijay Mishra as Santosh
 Sharbani Mukherjee as Tanu

References

External links
 332 Mumbai To India at Bollywood Hungama

Indian thriller films
2010 thriller films
2010 films
Films set in Mumbai
2010s Hindi-language films
Films scored by Shamir Tandon
Hindi-language thriller films